The 2022–23 Louisiana–Monroe Warhawks men's basketball team represented the University of Louisiana at Monroe in the 2022–23 NCAA Division I men's basketball season. The Warhawks, led by 13th-year head coach Keith Richard, played their home games at Fant–Ewing Coliseum in Monroe, Louisiana as members of the Sun Belt Conference.

Previous season
The Warhawks finished the 2021–22 season 13–18, 5–13 in Sun Belt play to finish in 11th place in the Sun Belt Conference. They lost to Arkansas State in the first round of the Sun Belt tournament.

Offseason

Departures

Incoming transfers

Recruiting classes

2022 recruiting class

2023 recruiting class

Preseason

Preseason Sun Belt Conference poll 
The Warhawks were picked to finish in last place in the conference's preseason poll. Junior forward Nika Metskhavarishvili was named preseason All-SBC Third Team.

Roster

Schedule and results

|-
!colspan=12 style=| Non-conference regular season

|-
!colspan=9 style=| Sun Belt regular season

|-
!colspan=9 style=|Sun Belt tournament

Source

References

Louisiana–Monroe Warhawks men's basketball seasons
Louisiana-Monroe Warhawks
Louisiana-Monroe Warhawks men's basketball
Louisiana-Monroe Warhawks men's basketball